Formula C may refer to:
 Formula C (game), an upcoming computer game
 Formula C (karting), a defunct 125 cc karting class
 Formula C (SCCA), the predecessor to the Formula Continental SCCA racing class